Manix Auriantal (born August 8, 1980) is a Rwandan-Canadian retired professional basketball player and is now actively dedicated to the next generation of Canadian athletes. He currently runs a basketball programme for Louis-Joseph Papineau high school in Montreal, Quebec, Canada. Auriantal has played for several teams from his hometown since graduating from the New York Institute of Technology in 2004. He has represented Rwanda in international competition, and played for them at the AfroBasket 2007.

Collegiate career 
Auriantal first attended Dawson College in Westmount, Quebec. He then transferred to the Globe Institute of Technology in New York City, United States. After one year, he began attending NYIT in the same city, where he played his final two seasons of basketball.

Professional basketball career 
Auriantal played with the Montreal Matrix of the American Basketball Association (ABA) from 2005 to 2006. On February 4, 2006, he was named ABA Player of the Week. Later that month, he was named to the 2006 All-Star Game along with former NBA All-Star Tim Hardaway. Auriantal began competing for BC Körmend of the Nemzeti Bajnokság I/A in Hungary in 2008. On October 18, he made his debut and scored a season-best 17 points vs EnterNet-NTE. The guard moved to the Montreal Jazz of the National Basketball League of Canada (NBL) for the 2012-13 season. He posted a season-high 36 points in a loss to the London Lightning on December 7, 2012 and, by the end of the season, led the league in steals, averaging 2.15 per game.

Personal 
Auriantal studied business at the New York Institute of Technology for his final two years of college. However, he returned to Montreal after graduating. Manix is from a family of seven children. He has three brothers that have also played professional basketball at a relatively high level. Ralph, Hennssy, and Rodwins, all played college basketball on a scholarship in the United States and earned a degree.

References

External links 
Manix Auriantal at RealGM
Manix Auriantal at USBasket.com
FIBA profile

ABA All-Star Game players
Living people
BC Körmend players
Canadian expatriate basketball people in Hungary
Canadian expatriate basketball people in the United States
Canadian men's basketball players
Canadian people of Rwandan descent
Dawson College alumni
Guards (basketball)
Montreal Jazz players
New York Institute of Technology alumni
Basketball players from Montreal
1980 births